The Timberlake–Branham House is a historic home located in Charlottesville, Virginia. It was built in 1886, and is a two-story, three-bay, single-pile I-house dwelling. It is sheathed in weatherboard and sits on a low brick foundation. It features a two-story semi-octagonal addition at the eastern end and a wing at the southwestern rear corner.  The house is occupied by the Dabney Foundation for Elders.

It was listed on the National Register of Historic Places in 1984.

References

Houses on the National Register of Historic Places in Virginia
Houses completed in 1886
Houses in Charlottesville, Virginia
National Register of Historic Places in Charlottesville, Virginia